Sonal R. Shah (born May 20, 1968), is an American economist, former lobbyist, and public official. She is the CEO of The Texas Tribune, a politics and public policy-specific news organization headquartered in Austin, Texas. Shah served as the National Policy Director for Mayor Pete Buttigieg's run in the 2020 United States presidential election. From April 2009 to August 2011, she served as the Director of the Office of Social Innovation and Civic Participation in the White House.

Shah is the founding executive director of the Beeck Center for Social Impact & Innovation at Georgetown University. Previously, Shah was a member of the Obama-Biden Transition Project and was the head of Global Development Initiatives, a philanthropic arm of Google.org.

Early life
Sonal Shah was born in Mumbai, India. She moved to the US in 1972 at the age of 4, and grew up in Houston, Texas. She graduated from the University of Chicago with a B.A. in Economics in 1990 and received a master's degree in Economics from Duke University.

Career

Public service
Shah held a variety of U.S. Department of Treasury positions from 1995 until 2001. She was the director of the office overseeing strategy and programs for sub-Saharan Africa, which included debt relief, development programs and World Bank/International Monetary Fund strategies. She worked with the Ministries of Finance in Bosnia and Kosovo to design the post-war banking system. During the Asian financial crisis, she served as a senior adviser to U.S. Treasury officials who were coordinating the U.S. response.

Private sector
From 2001–2003, Shah served at the Center for Global Development as Director of Operations and Programs, helping set up all aspects of the strategy, infrastructure and operations.

From 2003–2004, she worked at the Center for American Progress as an Associate Director, advising current and former Congressional and government executives on a wide variety of issues including trade, outsourcing and post-conflict reconstruction.

In 2004, Shah joined Goldman Sachs as a vice president, where she worked on green initiatives, which included informing clients and bankers on alternative energy opportunities and advising them on how to implement environmental, social and governance criteria for all investments.

In 2007, Shah joined Google.org as the head of Global Development Initiatives, and worked closely with Executive Director Larry Brilliant in guiding global economic development efforts. She also worked extensively on the growth of small and medium sized enterprises in partnership with the Omidyar Network and the Soros Foundation.

In July 2019, Shah joined the presidential campaign of South Bend Mayor, Pete Buttigieg as national policy director.

Return to public service
In April 2009, Shah was appointed director of the newly created White House Office of Social Innovation and Civic Participation. The objective of this office is to coordinate governmental efforts to aid innovative nonprofit groups and social entrepreneurs to address pressing social problems. Shah is also working with the National Security Council to bring a global perspective to these efforts.

Shah had served on Biden’s Unity Task Force. In 2021, she was left out from being appointed in the Biden administration after more than a dozen Indian-American organisations raised concerns about Shah's link with right wing Hindu nationalist RSS/BJP.

Hindu nationalist activism
Her father Ramesh Shah was the President of Overseas Friends of BJP-USA and is the founder of RSS-run Ekal Vidyalaya.

In 2001, Sonal Shah worked with the Vishwa Hindu Parishad (VHP) of America, a branch of the Hindu nationalist organization based in India, as the National Coordinator during the 2001 Gujarat earthquake. The VHP in India has been classified by the Central Intelligence Agency as a militant religious organization as of 2018.

Later in 2001, she co-founded the non-religious, non-profit Indicorps which recruits young people of Indian origin from all over the world to volunteer in India working for Indian NGOs. Indicorps volunteers have worked in the areas of education, health and sanitation, rural development, tsunami relief, and microfinance. She gave the key note address in 2004 talking about her work with Indicorps for the US's branch of the India-based Ekal Vidyala Foundation (EVF). The EVF in India has been accused of running schools that pursue a Hindu-nationalist agenda and generate hatred towards minorities. The EVF in 2005 lost public funding after the Indian federal government deemed it was "spreading hatred" against India's non-Hindu minority.

When she was appointed to the President Obama's transition team, leaders of the VHP and another Hindu nationalist organization, the RSS, issued a statement calling her a "proud member of the VHP, the daughter of Ramesh Shah, a very senior VHP leader." After her appointment to Obama's team and criticism of her links to India's Hindu nationalist movement, Shah disassociated herself from the VHP and condemned its role in the 2002 Gujarat riots.

Board Memberships
Shah is a board member of OXFAM America and of Zev Shapiro's organization TurnUp

Awards and recognition
Henry Crown Fellowship, Aspen Institute, 2006
Next Generation Fellow, American Assembly, Columbia University, 2007.
India Abroad Person of the Year, 2003

Papers and articles
Guiding Principles and Design of the MCA
Trading Views
Served on Commission for Weak States and National Security, Center for Global Development.
Social Finance: A Primer, Center for American Progress

References

1968 births
21st-century American economists
American Hindus
American people of Gujarati descent
American politicians of Indian descent
Duke University alumni
Harvard Institute of Politics
Henry Crown Fellows
Indian emigrants to the United States
Living people
Obama administration personnel
People from Houston
Politicians from Mumbai
University of Chicago alumni
Vishva Hindu Parishad members